Ramon "Monmon" Blanco Mitra III (born October 28, 1964) is the son of 1992 Presidential candidate and the former Speaker of the House of Representatives Ramon Mitra Jr. and older brother of incumbent Palawan Governor Abraham Mitra and music director Raul Mitra.

Early life
Ramon Blanco-Mitra III was born on October 28, 1964 in Puerto Princesa City, he is the son of Ramon Mitra Jr. and Cecilia Blanco. He is the third son of six siblings. The grandson of Engr. Eduardo J.Blanco a Dumaguete and Negros Oriental  World War II Hero and Martyr

Education
Mitra, a 1988 graduate of the Philippine Military Academy who served as captain in the Philippine Marine Corps, is a recipient of the country’s second highest award for gallantry, the Distinguished Conduct Star.

Political life
In 2009, it was announced that Mitra would be a Nacionalista Party (NP) senatorial bet for the 2010 Philippines Senate election, but he failed to garner enough votes to acquire a seat in the Senate.
In 2013 he ran for congressman of 2nd district of Palawan.

References

1964 births
Living people
People from Puerto Princesa
Nacionalista Party politicians
Philippine Marine Corps personnel
Recipients of the Distinguished Conduct Star